Martinos Christofi (born 26 July 1993) is a Cypriot-Finnish professional footballer who plays as a midfielder for Finnish club Lahti.

Club career
He started his career at AEL Limassol.

On 3 February 2022, Christofi signed with Lahti in Finland.

Club statistics

Honours
Ermis Aradippou
Cypriot Super Cup: 2014

References

External links

1993 births
People from Limassol
Living people
Cypriot footballers
Cyprus youth international footballers
Association football midfielders
AEL Limassol players
Alki Larnaca FC players
Ermis Aradippou FC players
Karmiotissa FC players
Doxa Katokopias FC players
FC Lahti players
Cypriot First Division players
Cypriot expatriate footballers
Expatriate footballers in Finland
Cypriot expatriate sportspeople in Finland